Solanum leucodendron is a species of plant in the family Solanaceae. The plant is endemic to the Atlantic Forest ecoregion in southeastern Brazil.

References

leucodendron
Endemic flora of Brazil
Flora of the Atlantic Forest
Conservation dependent plants
Near threatened flora of South America
Taxonomy articles created by Polbot